Andraž Vehovar (born 1 March 1972 in Ljubljana) is a Yugoslav born, Slovenian slalom canoeist who competed at the international level from 1988 to 1999.

He won a silver medal in the K1 event at the 1996 Summer Olympics in Atlanta. Vehovar's efforts earned him the Slovenian Sportsman of the year award in 1996.

He also won two silver medals in the K1 team event at the ICF Canoe Slalom World Championships, earning them in 1995 and 1999. He also has a silver and a bronze medal from the same event from the European Championships.

World Cup individual podiums

References

DatabaseOlympics.com profile
42-83 from Medal Winners ICF updated 2007.pdf?MenuID=Results/1107/0,Medal_winners_since_1936/1510/0 ICF medalists for Olympic and World Championships - Part 2: rest of flatwater (now sprint) and remaining canoeing disciplines: 1936-2007.

1972 births
Canoeists at the 1996 Summer Olympics
Living people
Olympic canoeists of Slovenia
Olympic silver medalists for Slovenia
Slovenian male canoeists
Olympic medalists in canoeing
Sportspeople from Ljubljana
Medalists at the 1996 Summer Olympics
Medalists at the ICF Canoe Slalom World Championships